Agent Phillip J. Coulson is a fictional character portrayed and voiced by Clark Gregg in the Marvel Cinematic Universe (MCU) media franchise. Coulson is depicted as a high-ranking member of the espionage agency S.H.I.E.L.D. and longtime partner of Nick Fury.

After Coulson is killed by Loki and the Avengers form to exact revenge on, Fury has Coulson resurrected with Kree blood to continue serving S.H.I.E.L.D., putting together a small team of agents supervised by Melinda May and coming to view one agent, Daisy Johnson, as a surrogate daughter. After rebuilding S.H.I.E.L.D. following its infiltration and destruction by Hydra, saving the planet, and making a deal with a demon to briefly become Ghost Rider, stripping him of the blood keeping him alive, Coulson retires to Tahiti with May, where he dies once again.

Following the destruction of Sarge, a biological duplicate of Coulson created by a monolith and inhabited by the Aztec god Pachakutiq, a Life Model Decoy (L.M.D.) of Coulson is made from a copy of his consciousness saved to a virtual reality, and Sarge's and May's genetic memories, resurrecting him again. After preventing an alternate timeline from being conquered by Chronicoms, Coulson decides to travel the world in his flying car, Lola.

Coulson was a central figure in the "Infinity Saga", appearing in five films, two television series, one digital series, and two Marvel One-Shots, most notably in The Avengers (2012) and Agents of S.H.I.E.L.D. (2013–2020). Several versions of Coulson from within the MCU multiverse also appear, notably in the live-action series Agents of S.H.I.E.L.D. and the animated series What If...? (2021), with Gregg reprising the role.

Coulson has additionally appeared in several forms of non-MCU media, being integrated into the mainstream Marvel Universe, initially modelled after Gregg and depicted as a S.H.I.E.L.D. agent and supporting character of Deadpool, before being redeveloped as a supervillain servant of the demon Mephisto and commander of the Squadron Supreme of America following his death and resurrection, and the main antagonist of "Heroes Reborn".

Marvel Cinematic Universe

Feature films

Partnering with Nick Fury

Captain Marvel, which is set in the 1990s, depicts Coulson as a rookie agent of S.H.I.E.L.D. who works closely with fellow agent Nick Fury.

Supervising Tony Stark

Agent Coulson was introduced in the film Iron Man, in which he attempts to debrief Tony Stark on his captivity in Afghanistan. He is also one of several agents who accompany Pepper Potts in an attempt to arrest Obadiah Stane once his criminal activities are revealed. In Iron Man 2, Coulson is assigned to supervise Stark for a time before being reassigned to investigate a crisis in New Mexico.

Meeting Thor

In both Iron Man 2s post-credits scene and Thor, Coulson's assignment is revealed to revolve around the discovery of Thor's hammer in the New Mexico desert. Coulson is able to form an alliance between S.H.I.E.L.D. and Thor, who mistakenly addresses Coulson as "Son of Coul."

Death

In The Avengers, Coulson is fatally wounded by Loki, which now-S.H.I.E.L.D. Director Nick Fury uses to motivate the Avengers.

Tie-in comics

Coulson appears throughout the MCU tie-in comics in supporting roles, acting in the S.H.I.E.L.D. agent capacity that he does in the films.

Short films

The Marvel One-Shot The Consultant, which takes place after The Incredible Hulk, sees Coulson and fellow agent Jasper Sitwell preventing Emil Blonsky from being added to the Avengers roster. A Funny Thing Happened on the Way to Thor's Hammer depicts Coulson getting into a scuffle on his way from Stark's lab in Iron Man 2 to Thor's hammer in Thor.

Television series

T.A.H.I.T.I. and resurrection
In Agents of S.H.I.E.L.D., Fury brought Coulson back to life using the T.A.H.I.T.I. project, which was meant to bring a dead Avenger back to life using GH-325, a drug derived from an ancient Kree corpse that S.H.I.E.L.D. had recovered in the past. However, test patients developed psychosis and hypergraphia, so Coulson had the project shut down and Fury had Coulson's memories replaced so he could live a healthy life. Following his resurrection, Coulson puts together a team of agents to travel the world and deal with strange new cases. During this time, Hydra is revealed to have infiltrated S.H.I.E.L.D., leading to the latter's demise. Fury makes Coulson the new director of S.H.I.E.L.D. and tasks him with rebuilding the agency "the right way".

Director of S.H.I.E.L.D.
Coulson's involvement with alien materials leads to a faction of S.H.I.E.L.D. agents led by Robert Gonzalez, who distrust secrets and superhumans attempting to take over the fledgling organization, but Coulson convinces them to let him stay on as director after helping save hundreds of civilians. Together, they defeat a faction of Inhumans, though Coulson loses a hand in the process.

Romancing Rosalind Price
Coulson later becomes romantically involved with Rosalind Price, the leader of an anti-Inhuman government task-force called the Advanced Threat Containment Unit (ATCU), until her death at the hands of Grant Ward, a Hydra agent who formerly worked with Coulson. Coulson gets revenge by crushing Ward's chest with his prosthetic hand.

Demotion and deal with demon
Following the signing of the Sokovia Accords, S.H.I.E.L.D. is re-legitimized, with the still officially dead Coulson replaced as director by Jeffrey Mace, though he is eventually able to retake command of operations while Mace serves as the public face of S.H.I.E.L.D. After the artificial intelligence AIDA attempts to take over the world, Coulson allows himself to briefly become a Ghost Rider to defeat her.

Travelling through time
Coulson and his teammates are later abducted and sent to the future, to prevent the extinction of humanity. After their return, his team discover the Ghost Rider burned through the GH-325 that kept Coulson alive, causing him to slowly die ever since. Despite the team's best efforts to save him, Coulson ultimately chooses to leave S.H.I.E.L.D. and live the remainder of his life in Tahiti with Melinda May, with whom he developed a romantic relationship.

Second death and resurrection
As the team, especially May and new Director Mack, mourn Coulson, they are perturbed by the arrival of the cold-blooded Sarge, an alien who is physically and genetically identical to Coulson.  They later learn Sarge's body was created in an accident involving three reality-altering Monoliths, and was inhabited by the entity Pachakutiq thousands of years ago, losing both its and Coulson's memories before becoming Sarge. Mack and Daisy kill Pachakutiq to avert the end of the world, but the team is forced to escape an attack by the cybernetic alien Chronicoms. To combat them, S.H.I.E.L.D. scientists Leo Fitz and Jemma Simmons make an enhanced Life Model Decoy of Coulson to guide them in a journey through S.H.I.E.L.D.'s past, beginning in the 1930s.

Life as an L.M.D.
The L.M.D. Coulson helps the team stop the Chronicoms from changing history while coping with his existence as a non-human entity. A year after the Chronicoms' defeat, Coulson takes a sabbatical to travel the world in a reconstruction of his red 1962 Chevrolet Corvette, Lola.

Alternate versions

Radcliffe LMDs 

After being corrupted by the power of the Darkhold, Holden Radcliffe and Aida builds a Life Model Decoys of Coulson and other S.H.I.E.L.D. agents programmed to impersonate him while his human self is imprisoned in the Framework, in order to allow them to steal the Darkhold for themselves. After being betrayed by the L.M.D. May, Radcliffe's Coulson L.M.D. is destroyed when the L.M.D. May blows up the empty S.H.I.E.L.D. base to allow its remaining human agents to escape.

History teacher 

After revealed to be trapped in the Darkhold-infused Framework virtual reality at the end of "Self Control", Coulson experiences a parallel lifetime in which he never joined S.H.I.E.L.D. and became a history teacher and conspiracy theorist who believes Hydra is using mind control soap to enslave the population of Earth. After being made aware of his alternate life as a S.H.I.E.L.D. agent by Daisy Johnson, Coulson assists her ensuring his escape from the Framework; upon awakening in the real world, the real Coulson is surprised that he remembers the life of his Framework self.

Destruction of Earth 

In an alternate 2018, after failing to stop a gravitonium-infused Glenn Talbot from accidentally destroying the Earth, Coulson and his team rescue a fraction of the Earth's population aboard their Lighthouse base, built to withstand the Earth's destruction, before eventually dying as a result of his deal with Ghost Rider.

Animated series 

Alternate versions of Coulson appears in the animated series What If...?, with Gregg reprising his role.

In an alternate 2011, Coulson witnesses the murders of five candidates of the Avengers Initiative, and investigates the mastermind behind their deaths with Nick Fury. In another alternate 2011, Coulson assists Maria Hill, acting director of S.H.I.E.L.D., in attempting to stop an out-of-control party hosted by Thor.

Digital series

After stepping down as director of S.H.I.E.L.D. following Agents of S.H.I.E.L.D. season three, Coulson appears in Slingshot to offer advice to S.H.I.E.L.D. asset Elena "Yo-Yo" Rodriguez.

Marvel Comics

Battle Scars
Phil Coulson first appeared in the mainstream Marvel Universe in Christopher Yost, Matt Fraction and Cullen Bunn's Battle Scars #6 (April 2012) as Nick Fury Jr.’s Ranger teammate nicknamed "Cheese". He is later revealed to be Coulson after he follows Fury in joining S.H.I.E.L.D. Coulson has gone on to appear in other comics set in the mainstream MU, including in the 2013 Secret Avengers series by Nick Spencer and Luke Ross, and in Thor: God of Thunder in 2014.

S.H.I.E.L.D. vol. 3
In July 2014 at San Diego Comic-Con International, Marvel Comics announced an ongoing series titled S.H.I.E.L.D., to be set in the mainstream Marvel Universe, and written by Mark Waid, beginning December 2014. The series is led by Coulson, and sees the canonical introduction of characters that originated from Agents of S.H.I.E.L.D, to which Waid said, "This is our chance to introduce a lot of the other characters into the Marvel Universe, and give them the Marvel Universe spin." Waid described the series as "done-in-one. Coulson and his team have a mission, and if we need someone for a mission, everyone in the Marvel Universe is available as a potential Agent." In this series, Coulson is the Supreme Commander of Special Operations for S.H.I.E.L.D. under Director Maria Hill.

Deadpool vol. 6
He has appeared in Deadpool, assisting S.H.I.E.L.D. agent Preston and paying Deadpool for his earlier services to S.H.I.E.L.D. During the "Secret Empire" event, Coulson learns that Steve Rogers was involved in attracting the Chitauri to invade Earth, and is subsequently shot from the sky and killed by Deadpool, under the order of Rogers.

Avengers vol. 8
Phil Coulson later turned up alive and appears as a member of the Power Elite where he meets with Thunderbolt Ross to talk about the Avengers going global. Coulson states to Ross that he has put together the Squadron Supreme of America to be the sanctioned superheroes of the United States, now expressing an intense hatred for "heroes" such as Captain America and Deadpool.

The Squadron Supreme of America are revealed to be simulacrums created by Mephisto and programmed by the Power Elite so that Phil Coulson can have them be a United States-sponsored superhero team, Coulson having gone to Hell after his death for unspecified war crimes, and made a deal with Mephisto to be restored to life. During the War of the Realms storyline, Coulson summons the Squadron Supreme of America to fight the invading Frost Giants. After the Squadron Supreme of America caused the Frost Giants to retreat, Phil Coulson sends them to Ohio which has become a battleground.

At The Pentagon, Phil Coulson is briefed about an intruder on Sublevel 7 by a Nick Fury L.M.D. when it turns out to be Black Panther. After noting that the Squadron Supreme herded the Frost Giants into Canada, Black Panther asks Coulson if the Squadron Supreme of America knows that he is a murderer, Coulson quotes "Why don't you ask them yourself?" The Squadron Supreme are summoned to confront Black Panther. Hyperion states that the Squadron Supreme are the United States' sanctioned superhero team in light of the Avengers becoming an anti-American team. As Nighthawk states to Blur that Black Panther will not run as he is under arrest, Black Panther states to them that he does not know how they got their powers and that they are not the Squadron Supreme, as he even asked if they trust Phil Coulson. Before they can grab him, Black Panther contacts Broo to teleport him away. As he disappears, the Black Panther states that Phil Coulson will not answer their questions and that the Avengers are not their enemies unless they force them to be.

Heroes Reborn
In "Heroes Reborn", Coulson uses the Pandemonium Cube to rewrite reality in Mephisto's name, erasing the Avengers from existence and making himself the President of the United States, watching the fight between Hyperion and Doctor Juggernaut. After his role in the reality change is discovered, Coulson faces Captain America in hand-to-hand combat, deriding his influence on American politics. After being defeated, and reality restored, Coulson is imprisoned in the Pandemonium Cube by Mephisto as punishment and brought before the Council of Red, a collection of Mephisto's counterparts from 615 other universes.

Concept and creation

Agent Phil Coulson was created by Mark Fergus, Hawk Ostby, Art Marcum and Matt Holloway for Iron Man, the first feature film in the MCU. Coulson was the first S.H.I.E.L.D. agent introduced in the MCU, and was portrayed by Clark Gregg, who was offered a three-picture deal. Gregg initially balked at this due to the character initially only being known as "Agent" and having few lines, but recognized Marvel's plan for an interconnected universe; the character was ultimately given the surname "Coulson" after Danny Coulson, whose book No Heroes: Inside the FBI's Secret Counter-Terror Force was used as a dialogue reference for Iron Man. Gregg went on to play the character in Iron Man 2, Thor, and The Avengers, the latter film in which he was provided the first name "Phil".

Throughout the films, Coulson is generally depicted as a supporting character of the protagonists and used to represent S.H.I.E.L.D.'s presence, to the point that Gregg has described Coulson as "the S.H.I.E.L.D. agent". However, for the Marvel One-Shot short films The Consultant and A Funny Thing Happened on the Way to Thor's Hammer, Coulson is given "a chance to stand in his own spotlight for once". This was a "natural" move for co-producer Brad Winderbaum, who wanted to "paint a picture of S.H.I.E.L.D. pulling the strings and being responsible for some of the events we've seen in the films. What better character to represent this idea than Agent Coulson, the first S.H.I.E.L.D. agent we were introduced to?"

At the 2012 New York Comic Con, Joss Whedon and Kevin Feige announced that Gregg would be starring as Coulson in Agents of S.H.I.E.L.D., despite the character dying in The Avengers, with Whedon saying "He's headlining the S.H.I.E.L.D. show and always was." Gregg said of Whedon's explanation for Coulson's resurrection, "I found it so fascinating and so true to the world of the comics and mythology in general as I understand them that I was immediately in." Regarding the amount of creative input he has over the character in the series, Gregg said, "I have meetings with [the showrunners] once or twice a year and talk about what the big ideas are ... They're really responsive to the fact that I've been involved with this person four, five years longer than them, but ... I have no complaints with what they're doing."

Agents of S.H.I.E.L.D. costume designer Ann Foley described Coulson as a "company man", wearing suits in "the S.H.I.E.L.D. palette—grey, black and navy with a distinct but subtle pattern." Foley did note "subtle changes" in Coulson's costuming in the series from the films, such as streamlined suits and "more slick" ties, "now that [he] is back after being 'killed' by Loki". After Coulson's hand is cut off in the second-season finale, which was realized by having a mechanical axe cut through a "faux arm made of tripe wrapped around a chicken thigh", Gregg described it as "heavy ... one of those things where you’re having the practical difficulty your character does. People were handing me stuff, like files, and I couldn’t really open them without using my nose." This practicality issue continued with the prosthetic hand Coulson subsequently has to use, with Gregg saying "the reality informs the thing. It’s really hard to figure out how to use this prosthetic, and that’s what Phil Coulson’s going through ... I’m hoping it evolves at some point." Gregg also noted that in the third season Coulson would be wearing more casual clothes, partly because "he can’t even seem to tie a tie" with his new hand. The prosthetic hand evolves throughout the season, with a later iteration projecting an energy shield, inspired by a similar one used in the comics by Captain America. The energy shield was created by Cosa, one of the series' visual effects vendors.

There had been considerations for Coulson to return in Iron Man 3 and Thor: The Dark World, but the character was not slated to appear in any more films. Whedon asserts, "As far as the fiction of the movies, Coulson is dead", elaborating that "generally [he feels] like the S.H.I.E.L.D. audience and The Avengers audiences are not actually the same group, necessarily," and so the films would have to explain Coulson's resurrection again for the film-only audience if he were to be reintroduced. Gregg reprises the role once again in Captain Marvel (2019), as the film is set in the 1990s. Gregg is digitally de-aged by 25 years, along with co-star Samuel L. Jackson, the first time Marvel has done this for an entire film. In regards to the character's resurrection within the MCU canon, however, Loki head writer Michael Waldron suggested that, as that show's series premiere "Glorious Purpose" implies, Coulson actually died in The Avengers and the events of Agents of S.H.I.E.L.D. take place in a parallel timeline.

Characterization
Gregg has stated, "I think of Agent Coulson, after all these years, as a guy with a full life. I think every day he's somewhere doing something for S.H.I.E.L.D., and yet I don't always know what that is... There's always a different twist. In this one he gets to show more of his wisecracking wit, and in this one he's a little bit more of a badass." Despite Coulson being called "the most recognizable face in the Marvel Comics movie universe", he is depicted as an "everyman" in a universe full of superheroes—"the glue that binds" the characters together. Gregg explained his portrayal of the character as "just a guy grumbling about his job ... he's tasked with handling these kind of diva superheroes, you know? 'Oh, really, Asgard? Dude, just get in the car.'"

On whether the resurrected Coulson would be the same as before he died, Gregg said "I don’t know how you could not change going through what he went through. I think if he hadn’t gone through some kind of change, it wouldn’t be any good. That said, I don’t know if he understands how much he’s changed." Later exploring some of those changes, Gregg stated "In some ways, he kinda finds himself not nearly as cold or ruthless as he would like to be, or as he has been. And at the same time, putting together this team, he feels driven by motives inside of himself that he can't quite always make sense of and that feels very new to him."

After Coulson was promoted to Director of S.H.I.E.L.D., Gregg said "He kind of got his dream job that I don’t even think he would have ever dreamed he would be given ... he’s got a little bit more of an idealistic, big hearted side of him [than Nick Fury does], some of which is going to be extinguished by the hard decisions he has to make." Speaking about the evolving nature of Coulson's relationship with his team, Gregg said "There’s a way he can afford an intimacy with all of them when they’re part of a small, elite squad on the Bus. It’s different than what’s possible for him as Director of S.H.I.E.L.D." Discussing Coulson's character progression through three seasons in relation to him killing Ward on the alien planet, executive producer Jeffrey Bell said, "First season Coulson would have beat Ward up and then thrown him over his shoulder and brought him back to Earth and locked him away. Season two Coulson would have defeated him and left him there on the other planet to fend for himself," while season three Coulson paused while the portal to Earth was already closing to take the time to kill Ward.

For the fourth season, Coulson is demoted back to field agent status. Gregg said that the reasoning for this "makes sense given that S.H.I.E.L.D. is coming out of the shadows. There are people that will want their person in charge." He felt that Coulson would actually prefer this, saying, "I always felt like Coulson was happiest in the field. Neither I nor Coulson loved playing and listening while his agents went into dangerous situations. And there are more dramatic possibilities when you have a boss that you have to deal with."

Alternate forms

Sarge / Pachakutiq
Sarge (portrayed by Clark Gregg) is an alien who occupies a clone body of Coulson which was created by the powers of the Di'Allas and sent hundred years into the past on his and Izel's home planet.

Phil Coulson (Chronicom L.M.D.)
Following the deaths of Izel and Sarge, Enoch and the Chronicoms on his side create a Life Model Decoy of Phil Coulson (portrayed by Clark Gregg) with all of Coulson's memories and modified with Chronicom technology.

Reception
In his review for Agents of S.H.I.E.L.D.s first season, Evan Valentine at Collider named Clark Gregg as one of the high points of the series, noting that the actor was "one positive I consistently point out in each and every episode". Valentine stated that "What made us fall in love with the character from the first Iron Man to his death in The Avengers is still alive and kicking. Coulson was able to throw out quips like none other, while also turning on a dime, and expressing serious rage in moments ... Gregg raises the S.H.I.E.L.D. banner high". Reviewing the episode "The Writing on the Wall", which concluded the majority of Coulson's storyline in the series up to that point, Kevin Fitzpatrick of Screen Crush praised how Coulson had become "unglued" throughout the series, which had "pushed the newly-minted director into some dark places". Eric Goldman, reviewing for IGN, was also positive of the "unhinged version of Coulson", as well as the more serious leadership role the character took on for the second season, with Goldman finding Coulson's decision in "Making Friends and Influencing People" that Donnie Gill "either went with them or had to be taken out" to be especially notable.

Other appearances

Animation
 Coulson makes a by-name cameo appearance in the Iron Man: Armored Adventures episode "Extremis" as one of the S.H.I.E.L.D. agents encountering and being attacked by the recently mutated renegade agent, Mallen.
 At the 2011 San Diego Comic-Con International, it was announced that Gregg would return to voice Phil Coulson in the cartoon series Ultimate Spider-Man, where he appears as a S.H.I.E.L.D. agent and Peter Parker's school principal. He appears in seasons one and two.
 Coulson makes a brief cameo in the first episode of the anime Marvel Disk Wars: The Avengers, wherein he shows S.H.I.E.L.D. facilities, including a supervillain prison.

Comic books

The Avengers: Earth's Mightiest Heroes
The comic book continuation of The Avengers: Earth's Mightiest Heroes animated television series is told from the perspective of Coulson, despite not appearing as a character in the original show.

Ultimate Marvel
In 2014, the Ultimate version of Phil Coulson debuted in the Ultimate FF series as an ex-Agent of S.H.I.E.L.D. turned Director of the Future Foundation.

Marvel 1602
In November 2015, a 17th-century version of Coulson appeared in the series 1602: Witch Hunter Angela.

Spidey
Phil Coulson appears in the Spidey comic book.

Video games
 Phil Coulson appears as a playable character in Marvel Super Hero Squad Online, voiced by Tom Kenny.
 Phil Coulson appears as a non-player character in Marvel Heroes, with Clark Gregg reprising his role.
 Phil Coulson appears as a non-player character in Marvel: Avengers Alliance, Alliance 2, and Alliance Tactics.
 Phil Coulson appears in Lego Marvel Super Heroes, with Clark Gregg reprising his role. His character becomes playable after completing a side mission involving him overseeing Doctor Octopus' community service by fixing the Daily Bugles offices. His attack is the "Destroyer Gun", which he used against Loki in The Avengers.
 Phil Coulson appears as a playable character in Marvel: Future Fight.
 Phil Coulson appears in Lego Marvel's Avengers, voiced again by Clark Gregg.
 Phil Coulson appears as a playable character in Marvel Avengers Academy, voiced by Billy Kametz.
 Phil Coulson appears as a playable character in the match-three mobile game Marvel Puzzle Quest.
 Phil Coulson appears as a playable character in Marvel Strike Force.

See also
 Characters of the Marvel Cinematic Universe

References

External links
 Phil Coulson at the Marvel Cinematic Universe Wiki
 
 Phil Coulson on Marvel.com

Agents of S.H.I.E.L.D.
Avengers (comics) characters
Characters created by Christopher Yost
Characters created by Matt Fraction
Comics characters introduced in 2012
Fictional American secret agents
Fictional Iraq War veterans
Fictional United States Army Rangers personnel
Fictional amputees
Fictional characters from Wisconsin
Fictional characters who have made pacts with devils
Fictional characters with post-traumatic stress disorder
Fictional military strategists
Fictional murdered people
Fictional people from the 21st-century
Fictional presidents of the United States
Fictional principals and headteachers
Fictional shield fighters
Fictional spymasters
Film characters introduced in 2008
Male characters in film
Male characters in television
Marvel Cinematic Universe original characters
Marvel Comics cyborgs
Marvel Comics male supervillains
Marvel Comics television characters
S.H.I.E.L.D. agents
Squadron Supreme